The Croatian Hockey League Season for 2009-2010 was the 19th such season. The regular season was won by KHL Mladost and the playoffs were won by KHL Medveščak II.

Teams

 KHL Mladost
 KHL Medveščak II
 KHL Zagreb
 HK Ina Sisak

Regular season
The regular season was won by KHL Mladost.

Playoffs

Semifinals 
 KHL Medveščak Zagreb II – HK Sisak 2:0 (16:5, 16:5)
 KHL Mladost Zagreb – KHL Zagreb 2:0 (8:6, 11:4)

3rd place game 
 KHL Zagreb – HK Sisak 13:4

Final 
 KHL Medveščak Zagreb II – KHL Mladost Zagreb 2:0 (5:2, 6:3)

References

Croatian Ice Hockey League Season
1
Croatian Ice Hockey League seasons